Space industry refers to economic activities related to manufacturing components that go into Earth's orbit or beyond, delivering them to those regions, and related services. Owing to the prominence of the satellite-related activities, some sources use the term satellite industry interchangeably with the term space industry. The term space business has also been used. A narrow definition encompasses only hardware providers (primarily related to launch vehicles and satellites). This definition does not exclude certain activities, such as space tourism. Thus more broadly, space industry can be described as the companies involved in the space economy, and providing goods and services related to space. Space economy has been defined as "all public and private actors involved in developing and providing space-enabled products and services. It comprises a long value-added chaining, starting with research and development actors and manufacturers of space hardware and ending with the providers of space-enabled products and services to final users."

Segments and revenues
The three major sectors of the space industry are: satellite manufacturing, support ground equipment manufacturing, and the launch industry. The satellite manufacturing sector is composed of satellite and their subsystems manufacturers. The ground equipment sector is composed of manufacturing items like mobile terminals, gateways, control stations, VSATs, direct broadcast satellite dishes, and other specialized equipment. The launch sector is composed of launch services, vehicle manufacturing and subsystem manufacturing. Every euro spent in the space industry returns around six euros to the economy, according to the European Space Agency. This makes it a critical sector for economic development, competitiveness, and high-tech jobs.

With regards to the worldwide satellite industry revenues, in the period 2002 to 2005 those remained at the 35–36 billion USD level. In that, majority of revenue was generated by the ground equipment sector, with the least amount by the launch sector. Space-related services are estimated at about US$100 billion. The industry and related sectors employ about 120,000 people in the OECD countries, while the space industry of Russia employs around 250,000 people. Capital stocks estimated the worth of 937 satellites in Earth's orbit in 2005 at around 170 to US$230 billion. In 2005, OECD countries budgeted around US$45 billion for space-related activities; income from space-derived products and services has been estimated at US$110–120 billion in 2006 (worldwide).

History and trends
The space industry began to develop after World War II, as rockets and then satellites entered into military arsenals, and later found civilian applications.
It retains significant ties to the government. In particular, the launch industry features a significant government involvement, with some launch platforms (like the Space Shuttle) being operated by governments. In recent years, however, private spaceflight is becoming realistic, and even major government agencies, such as NASA, have begun relying on privately operated launch services. Some future developments of the space industry that are increasingly being considered include new services such as space tourism.

From 2004–2013, total orbital launches by country/region were:  Russia: 270, US: 181, China: 108, Europe: 59, Japan: 24, India: 19 and Brazil: 1.

Relevant trends in the 2008–2009 for the space industry have been described as:
the appearance of new satellite operators;
a growing demand for Fixed Service Satellites and developing market for Mobile Satellite Services;
a steady amount of commercial satellite orders;
steady performance of the launch sector;
resilience to the financial crisis;
maturing markets for services like Ka-band and remote sensing.

The 2019 Space Report estimates that in 2018 total global space activity was $414.75 Billion. Of that, the report estimates that 21%, or $87.09 Billion, was from U.S. Government Space Budgets.

A report discussing global space spending in 2021 estimated global spending at approximately $92 billion.

See also
 Commercialization of space
 Space-based economy
 Space trade
 Space manufacturing
 Lunar resources
 Asteroid mining
 Space industry per country
 Space industry of Russia
 Space industry of India
 Aerospace industry in the United Kingdom
 Commercial Spaceflight Federation (US)
 Space law
 Outer Space Treaty

References

External links

CubeSat Database & Nanosatellites
NewSpace Index

 
Industries (economics)